West Sound (or Westsound) is an unincorporated community on Orcas Island in San Juan County, Washington, United States.

Transportation 
The locality is served by the Westsound Seaplane Base .

Unincorporated communities in San Juan County, Washington
Unincorporated communities in Washington (state)